Alloprevotella tannerae is a Gram-negative, obligately anaerobic, non-spore-forming, rod-shaped and non-motile bacterium from the genus of Alloprevotella which has been isolated from a human gingival crevice.

References

Bacteria described in 1994